A toga is a garment worn in ancient Rome.

Toga may also refer to:

Places

Fiji
 Toga District, Rewa Province
 Toga River

Japan
 Toga, Toyama, a village
 Toga Dam
 Toga Shrine, a Shinto shrine in Toyokawa

United States
 Toga, Missouri, an unincorporated community
 Toga, Virginia, an unincorporated community

Elsewhere
 Toga (island), an island of the Torres group of Vanuatu
 Toga, Castellón, a municipality in Spain
 Tonga, a nation in the Pacific, whose name was officially spelt "Toga" from 1897 until 1949

Biology and healthcare 
 Toga virus or Hepatitis F virus
 Transoral gastroplasty, TOGA, a gastric stapling procedure

Acronym
 Takeoff/go-around switch, used in aviation
 Tropical Ocean Global Atmosphere program, a research program in tropical meteorology

Other uses
 Toga language (disambiguation)
 Torra di Toga, a tower in Ville-di-Pietrabugno, Corsica
 Himiko Toga, a recurring villain in the anime and manga series My Hero Academia
 Toga, an African penguin who was stolen from the Amazon World Zoo Park, Isle of Wight, England
 Toga II, a derivative of the chess software Fruit

See also

Tola (disambiguation)
Tonga (name)
Tova (disambiguation)